Dancing the Big Twist is an album by pianist Ray Bryant released on Columbia Records in 1961 to capitalise on the Twist dance craze.

Reception 

The Allmusic review stated "This session will appeal to those who favor Bryant's dance hit of the era, 'Madison Time'".

Track listing 
 "Twist City" (Matthew Gee) – 5:45
 "Just a Little Bit of Twist" (Don Covay) – 2:46
 "Big Susie" (Ray Bryant) – 5:22
 "Twist On" (Bryant) – 4:46
 "Twistin' an a Cat's Paw" (BuddyTate) – 5:00
 "Mo-Lasses" (Joe Newman) – 5:15
 "Fast Twist" (Harry Edison, Bryant) – 2:15
 "Do That Twist (Early In The Morning)" (Gee) – 5:31
Recorded at Columbia Records, 30th Street Studio, NYC., on December 27, 1960 (track 7), October 23, 1961 (tracks 2, 3 & 8) and October 26, 1961 (tracks 1 & 4–6)

Personnel 
Ray Bryant – piano
Harry Edison (track 7), Pat Jenkins (tracks 1–6 & 8), Joe Newman (tracks 1–6 & 8) – trumpet
Matthew Gee – trombone (tracks 1–6 & 8)
Ben Richardson – baritone saxophone (track 7) 
Buddy Tate – tenor saxophone
Bill Lee (track 7), Jimmy Rowser (tracks 1–6 & 8) – bass 
Gus Johnson (track 7), Mickey Roker (tracks 1–6 & 8) – drums
Ray Barretto – congas (track 7)
Don Covay – vocals (track 2)

References 

1961 albums
Ray Bryant albums
Columbia Records albums
Albums produced by John Hammond (producer)